Barbara Grunes is the author or co-author of 50+ cookbooks.  A food consultant and historian, Grunes has also written on food and dining for the Chicago Sun Times and food consultant to the State of Illinois.  She is well known as an effusive and popular cooking teacher and food writer in the Chicago area.  Barbara Grunes is the most published cook book writer in history putting the Midwest on the culinary map and making flour-less chocolate cake a household phrase.

Barbara Grunes has written cookbooks on all major subjects, including an entire series on grill cooking featuring Fish on the Grill, Poultry on the Grill, and Beef Lover's Great Grill Book.  She lives in Chicago.

Early life
Barbara Grunes was born in Boston, Massachusetts on June 12, 1931. As a girl she learned how to cook at her mother's side in her family's home in Revere, Massachusetts. She began her career as an education psychologist.

How Barbara Grunes got started writing cookbooks
As a newlywed, she asked her husband what he liked to eat. To which he responded, "I quite like Chinese food". After cooking lessons and research her first cookbook, Cuisine de Chine, was born.  (Cuisine de Chine by Barbara Grunes (Paperback – 1978).  It was published under Dorothy Press in 1974.  In it she did what Julia Child did with French food; Grunes made Chinese cooking for the first time accessible to the American public.

Publications

Cuisine De Chine,  Barbara Grunes Dorothy Press (Paperback – 1974) ASIN: B00071I2KW
The Ultimate Food Processor Cookbook,  Barbara Grunes  Consumer Guide Publishing (Paperback – 1980) 
Oriental Express; Chinese Menus for the Food Processor,  Barbara Grunes  Good Food Books (Paperback – 1978) 
Inside the Convection Oven, Barbara Grunes and Maxine Horwitz co-author, paperback, 1975, Good Food Books 
Fish on the Grill: More Than 70 Elegant, Easy, and Delectable Recipes, by Barbara Grunes and Phyllis Magida coauthor (Paperback – May 1986) 
All-American Vegetarian: A Regional Harvest of 200 Low-Fat Recipes, by Barbara Grunes and Virginia Van Vynckt coauthor (Paperback – Jun 1, 1995) 
Williams-Sonoma: Roasting by Barbara Grunes,  (Hardcover – Nov 5, 2002) 
Gourmet Fish on the Grill: More Than 90 Easy Recipes for Elegant Entertaining, by Barbara Grunes and Phyllis Magida (Paperback – Apr 1989) 
Healthy Grilling : Sizzling Favorites for Indoor and Outdoor Grills by Barbara Grunes (Paperback – May 20, 2001) 
Puddings and Pies: Traditional Desserts for a New Generation by Barbara Grunes (Paperback – Sep 1991) 
Wok Every Day by Barbara Grunes, Sheri Giblin and Virginia Van Vynckt coauthor (Paperback – Oct 2003 224 pages) 
All-American Vegetarian: A Regional Harvest of Low-Fat Recipes by Barbara Grunes and Virginia Van Vynckt coauthor (Hardcover – Oct 1995) 
The Complete Fish on the Grill by Barbara Grunes and Phyllis Magida coauthor (Paperback – Apr 1, 1994) 
Diabetes Snacks, Treats, and Easy Eats for Kids: 130 Recipes for the Foods Kids Really Like to Eat  Barbara Grunes author (Paperback – May 1, 2010) 
Skinny Chocolate/over 100 Sinfully Delicious-Yet Low-Fat-Recipes for Cakes, Cookies, Savories, and Chocoholic Treats  Phyllis Magida and Barbara Grunes coauthor (Paperback – May 1994) 
Roots: The Underground Cookbook Barbara Grunes and Anne Elise Hunt coauthor (Paperback – Jun 1993) 
The Great Big Cookie Book: Over 200 Scrumptious Recipes for Cookie Lovers Barbara Grunes and Virginia Van Vynckt coauthor (Paperback – Nov 1996) 
The Heartland Food Society Cookbook: New and Traditional Cuisine Barbara Grunes author (Paperback – Nov 5, 1996) 
Dining in—Chicago: A collection of gourmet recipes for complete meals from the area's finest restaurants (Dining in—the great cities)  Barbara Grunes author (Paperback – 1982) 
Dining in Chicago Volume III (Dining in Series) by Barbara Grunes (Paperback – Oct 1983) Peanut Butter Publishing 
The Home & Grill Cookbook: Complete Meals on the Stovetop Grill (101 production series) by Barbara Grunes (Paperback – Mar 1992)*
Diabetes Snacks, Treats, and Easy Eats: 130 Recipes You'll Make Again and Again by Barbara Grunes and R.D. Linda R. Yoakam (Paperback – Apr 27, 2010)
Chocolate Classics by Barbara Grunes and Phyllis Magida (Hardcover – Oct 1993)
The Beef Lover's Great Grill Book/Favorite Recipes for Hot and Sizzlin Grilled Beef—As Well As Pork, Veal, Lamb, Game and More by Barbara Grunes (Paperback – Mar 1991)
The Complete Fish Cook/100 Delicious Recipes for Grilling, Sauteing, Broiling, Pan Frying, Smoking, and More by Barbara Grunes and Phyllis Magida (Paperback – Apr 1990)
Shellfish on the Grill by Phyllis Magida and Barbara Grunes (Paperback – May 1988)
The Southwestern Sampler by Barbara Grunes and Phyllis Magida (Paperback – Aug 1987)
Soups and Stews (Ideals Cook Books) by Barbara Grunes (Paperback – Sep 1988)
The Complete Idiot's Guide to Grilling by Barbara Grunes and Virginia Van Vynckt (Paperback – 1999)
Skinny Grilling: Over 100 Inventive Low-Fat Recipes for Grilling Meats, Fish, Poultry, Vegetables, and Desserts by Barbara Grunes (Paperback – Mar 28, 1995)
The American Regional Cookbook by Barbara Grunes (Paperback – 1986)
Grill: Cookbook (Williams-Sonoma Cookware) by Barbara Grunes  (Hardcover – Mar 1999)
Think Thin Pizzas by Barbara Grunes (Hardcover – Apr 2, 2002)
The Joy of Baking by Barbara Grunes (Hardcover – 1986)
Meatless Diabetic Cookbook: Over 100 Easy Recipes Combining Great Taste with Great Nutrition by Barbara Grunes (Paperback – Aug 6, 1997)
The Best Bake Sale Ever Cookbook by Barbara Grunes and Susie Cushner (Paperback – Mar 8, 2007)
All-American Waves of Grain: How to Buy, Store, and Cook Every Imaginable Grain by Barbara Grunes and Virginia Van Vynckt (Hardcover – May 1997)
All Holidays Menus (Book IV) by Barbara Grunes (Hardcover – Jan 1, 2000)
Appetizers on the Grill: Innovative Hors D'Oeuvres, Pizzas, Gourmet Sandwiches, and Light Entrees by Barbara Grunes (Paperback – Apr 1992)
Skinny Potatoes (Skinny Cookbooks) by Barbara Grunes (Hardcover – Dec 1993)
Fish on the Grill: More than 70 Elegant, Easy, and Delectable Recipes by Barbara, and Magida, Phyllis Grunes (Unknown Binding – 1986)
The Chef's Kitchen Companion by Barbara Grunes (Hardcover – 1984)
Skinny Pizzas: Over 100 Healthy Low-Fat Recipes for America's Favorite Fun Food (The Popular Skinny Cookbook Series) by Barbara Grunes (Paperback – Mar 1996)
The Ultimate Cookie Cookbook by Barbara Grunes and Virginia Van Vynckt (Hardcover – Oct 12, 1999)
Very Merry Cookie Party: How to Plan and Host a Christmas Cookie Exchange by Virginia Van Vynckt, Barbara Grunes  (Paperback – Sep 29, 2010)
Grill it in!: Recipes for the Burton Stovetop Grill by Barbara Grunes (Paperback – 1991)
Chicago Epicure: A Menu Guide to the Chicago Area's Finest Restaurants (E. Wolf Series of Distinctive Dining) by Barbara Grunes and Barbara Revsine (Paperback – Aug 1986)
Complete Grilling Cookbook (Williams Sonoma Kitchen Library) co-author (Hardcover – Mar 2001)
Homemade Cookies by Barbara Grunes (Paperback – Jun 1984)
Indoor Grilling (A Collection of Recipes Developed for the Burton Stove Top Grills) by Barbara Grunes (Paperback – Jun 1, 1990)
Kabobs on the Grill by Barbara Grunes (Paperback – May 1992)
Fish and Seafood Cookbook (Ideals Cook Books) by Barbara Grunes (Paperback – Jul 1985)
Mexican Cookbook by Barbara Grunes (Paperback – Feb 1981)
Lunch and Brunch Cookbook (Ideals Cook Books) by Barbara Grunes (Paperback – June 1985)
Skinny Seafood by Barbara Grunes (Paperback – May 1993) 
A Treasury For All Seasons Cookbook - Book I, Grill & Barbecue Cooking; Book II, Old-fashioned Family Cookbook by Clarice L.; Book III by Mariano, Louise; Book IV by Grunes, Barbara Ideals Publishing Corp.; Book II by Moon (Hardcover – 1984)
Grill It In! A Collection of Recipes Developed for the Burton Stove Top Grills by Barbara Grunes (Paperback – 1991)
Cooking Vegetarian: The Lazy Way (Macmillan Lifestyles Guide) by Barbara Grunes (Paperback – May 1999)
Roasting by Grunes, Barbara (author) [Hard ... 2002 (Hardcover – Nov 5, 2002)
Diabetes Snacks, Treats, and Easy Eats: 130 Recipes You'll Make Again and Again [Paperback] by Barbara Grunes (Author) R.D. Linda R. Yoakam (Contributor) (Unknown Binding – 2010)
Wok Every Day [Paperback] by Sheri Giblin (Photographer) Barbara Grunes (Author) Virginia Van Vynckt (Author) (Unknown Binding – 2003)
Food Processor Cookbook by Barbara Grunes and Julie Hogan (Paperback – Nov 1981)
Al Horno: Roasting, Spanish-Language Edition (Coleccion Williams-Sonoma) (Spanish Edition) by Barbara Grunes (Hardcover – Oct 14, 2004)
Essentials of Grilling (Williams-Sonoma) by Barbara Grunes (Hardcover – 2003) 
A Treasury For All Seasons Cookbook - Grill & Barbecue Cooking; Old-fashioned Family Cookbook; Light Menus; All Holiday Menus by Clarice L.; Mariano, Louise; Grunes, Barbara Moon (Hardcover – 1984)
Skinny Potatoes - Over 100 Delicious New Low-fat Recipes For The World's Most Versatile Vegetable by Barbara Grunes (Paperback – 1993)
Heartland Food Society Cookbook by Barbara Grunes (Paperback – 1994)
Indoor Grilling by Barbara Grunes (Paperback – 1990)
Skinny Pizzas: Over One Hundred Healthy, Low-Fat Recipes for America's Favorite Fun Food by Barbara Grunes (Hardcover – 1993)
Ideals Homemade Cookies by Barbara Grunes (Paperback – 1984)
Diabetes Snacks, Treats, and Easy Eats: 130 Recipes You'll Make Again and Again by Barbara Grunes  (Kindle Edition – Apr 28, 2010) – Kindle eBook
Healthy Grilling: Sizzling Favorites for Indoor and Outdoor Grills by Barbara Grunes (Kindle Edition – Apr 29, 2011) – Kindle eBook
Food Processor Cookbook [Barbara Grunes Paperback – 1969 
The Williams-Sonoma Baking Book, by Barbara Grunes coauthor (Hard Cover – 2009) Weldon Owen Inc. 
Joy of Baking, Barbara Grunes Ideals Publishing (Hard Cover – 1986) 
Diabetes Cooking 101, by Barbara Grunes coauthor (Paperback – 2011) Agate Publishing

References

External links 
 https://web.archive.org/web/20110908055439/http://authors.simonandschuster.com/Barbara-Grunes/17911592
 http://www.barnesandnoble.com/c/barbara-grunes
 http://www.goodreads.com/author/show/61435.Barbara_Grunes
 https://web.archive.org/web/20120502175534/http://www.topchinesefoods.com/cuisine-de-chine-chinese-cooking-made-fast-and-easy-with-the-food-processor/

1941 births
Living people
American food writers
People from Revere, Massachusetts
Women food writers
Women cookbook writers
Lesley University alumni
American women non-fiction writers
21st-century American women